Vis-à-vis is the second studio album by Slovak musician Karol Mikloš, issued via  on October 21, 2002. Based on available music reviews, the work met with mixed to positive commentaries.

Reception

Critical response

Vis-à-vis spawned miscellaneous reactions among music journalists, with moderately prevailing positive. Daniel Baláž of SME commented that "an intelligent pop music established on oddly set up chords to old-fashioned melodic songwriting [it] is simply of his own". Seeing some resemblance to Miroslav Žbirka and Ladislav Lučenič, the author in general acknowledged Mikloš'es musical direction, including his deliberate and shy performing on public. Jaroslav Špulák from &MusiQ, formerly Rock & Pop magazine, emphasized the album's mood, inner drive as well its good production which "compete with the rest European recordings in the mainstream ranking excellently".

Other critics such as Pavel Seifert of FreeMusic.cz, were less enthusiastic. He concluded in his review: "Having own sound and style is a potential prerequisite for success of any performer, but only when they make an effort in cultivating it. Songs [by Mikloš] do have their sound and style. The[ir] stroke of fate is however, that due to an identical pattern you come to the feeling at the end of the CD as if you were listening to the same track ever since.

Commercial performance
The album release didn't enter record charts, nor did any of the released singles.

Track listings

Credits and personnel
 Management
 Recording studio – Mikloš'es home, Trenčín • Sedis Studio, Topoľčany • IMI Studio, Bratislava • Exponent Studio, Hlohovec, Slovakia
 Publishing –  & Publishing, Bratislava, SK

 Production
 Writers – Andrej Monček  • Mikloš  
 Mastering – Sedis Studio • Mikloš'es home
 Production and mixing – Monček • Mikloš • Roman Hlubina
 Programming – Monček • Mikloš
 Engineering – Ján Došek
 Press – GZ Digital Media , Loděnice, Czech Republic

 Personnel
 Lead vocals – Mikloš
 Backing vocals – Emília Lokšenincová • Second Nature
 Musical instruments – Second Nature
 Guitars – Mikloš and Hlubina  • Monček  • Marián Králik 
 Drums – František Kraus
 Synthesizers – Monček • Mikloš
 Photography – Ivana • Ján Čajda • Rado D. • Vrbkin
 Cover art – Mikloš
 Graphic design – Vladimir Yurkovic

Awards

References

External links
 Vis-à-vis (Official website)
 Vis-à-vis on Bandcamp 
 Vis-à-vis on Discogs 

Karol Mikloš albums
2002 albums
Millenium Records albums